Mykola Mykolayevich Tomyn (born December 28, 1948) is a former Soviet/Ukrainian handball player who competed in the 1976 Summer Olympics and in the 1980 Summer Olympics.

In 1976 he won the gold medal with the Soviet team. He played all six matches as goalkeeper.

Four years later he was part of the Soviet team which won the silver medal. He played all six matches as goalkeeper again.

External links
profile

1948 births
Living people
Soviet male handball players
Ukrainian male handball players
Handball players at the 1976 Summer Olympics
Handball players at the 1980 Summer Olympics
Olympic handball players of the Soviet Union
Olympic gold medalists for the Soviet Union
Olympic silver medalists for the Soviet Union
Olympic medalists in handball
Medalists at the 1980 Summer Olympics
Medalists at the 1976 Summer Olympics
ZTR players